St. James Cathedral is the mother church of the Episcopal Church in the United States of America Diocese of Chicago in Chicago, Illinois.  The cathedral stands at the corner of Huron and Wabash streets.  It is the oldest church of the Anglican Communion and Episcopal tradition in the Chicago area, having been founded in 1834. Originally built as a parish church, that building was mostly destroyed in the Great Chicago Fire.  Only the bell tower survived, and this was incorporated into the rebuilt church, including the soot-stained stones around the top of the tower which remain black today.  St. James received the status of cathedral in 1928 after the Cathedral Church of St. Peter and St. Paul was destroyed in a fire in 1921, but the arrangement was terminated in 1931.  On May 3, 1955, St. James was again designated the cathedral and was formally set apart on June 4, 1955.  The church is led by the Episcopal Bishop of Chicago.

Together with the Roman Catholic Holy Name Cathedral on State Street and the Greek Orthodox Annunciation Cathedral on LaSalle Street, the churches form the Cathedral District of Chicago.

See also
List of the Episcopal cathedrals of the United States
List of cathedrals in the United States

References

External links
 

1834 establishments in Illinois
19th-century Episcopal church buildings
James Cathedral
Churches completed in 1857
James, Chicago
Episcopal church buildings in Illinois
Gothic Revival church buildings in Illinois
Religious organizations established in 1834